Keykubad (died 1348) was the 31st ruler of Shirvan who overthrew Mongol rule. Not much information about him is known.

References

1348 deaths
Year of birth unknown
14th-century Iranian people